DSM-IV codes are the classification found in the Diagnostic and Statistical Manual of Mental Disorders, 4th Edition, Text Revision, also known as DSM-IV-TR, a manual published by the American Psychiatric Association (APA) that includes almost all currently recognized mental health disorders.  The DSM-IV codes are thus used by mental health professionals to describe the features of a given mental disorder and indicate how the disorder can be distinguished from other, similar problems.

The coding system utilized by the DSM-IV is designed to correspond with codes from the International Classification of Diseases, Ninth Revision, Clinical Modification, commonly referred to as the ICD-9-CM. Since early versions of the DSM did not correlate with ICD codes and updates of the publications for the ICD and the DSM are not simultaneous, some distinctions in the coding systems may still be present.  For this reason, it is recommended that users of these manuals consult the appropriate reference when accessing diagnostic codes

Note that NOS is an abbreviation for Not Otherwise Specified, indicating a cluster of symptoms that do not clearly fit in any single diagnostic category. NOS is often a provisional diagnosis pending additional information or testing.

For an alphabetical list, see DSM-IV codes (alphabetical).

Disorders usually first diagnosed in infancy, childhood, or adolescence

Mental retardation
 317 Mild mental retardation
 318.0 Moderate mental retardation
 318.1 Severe mental retardation
 318.2 Profound mental retardation
 319 Mental retardation; severity unspecified

Learning disorders
 315.00 Reading disorder
 315.1 Mathematics disorder
 315.2 Disorder of written expression
 315.9 Learning disorder NOS

Motor skills disorders
 315.4 Developmental coordination disorder

Communication disorders
 315.31 Expressive language disorder
 315.32 Mixed receptive-expressive language disorder
 315.39 Phonological disorder
 307.0 Stuttering
 307.9 Communication disorder NOS

Pervasive developmental disorders
 299.00 Autistic Disorder
 299.80 Rett's Disorder
 299.10 Childhood Disintegrative Disorder
 299.80 Asperger Syndrome
 299.80 PDD-NOS

Attention-deficit and disruptive behavior disorders
 Attention-Deficit Hyperactivity Disorder
 314.01 Combined subtype
 314.01 Predominantly hyperactive-impulsive subtype
 314.00 Predominantly inattentive subtype
 314.9 Attention-Deficit Hyperactivity Disorder NOS
 Conduct disorder
 312.81 Childhood onset
 312.82 Adolescent onset
 312.89 Unspecified onset
 313.81 Oppositional Defiant Disorder
 312.9 Disruptive Behavior Disorder NOS

Feeding and eating disorders of infancy or early childhood
 307.52 Pica
 307.53 Rumination disorder
 307.59 Feeding disorder of infancy or early childhood

Tic disorders
 307.23 Tourette's Disorder
 307.22 Chronic motor or vocal tic disorder
 307.21 Transient tic disorder
 307.20 Tic disorder NOS

Elimination disorders
 307.6 Enuresis (not due to a general medical condition)
 307.7 Encopresis, without constipation and overflow incontinence
 787.6 Encopresis, with constipation and overflow incontinence

Other disorders of infancy, childhood, or adolescence
 309.21 Separation anxiety disorder
 313.23 Selective mutism
 313.89 Reactive attachment disorder of infancy or early childhood
 307.3 Stereotypic movement disorder
 313.9 Disorder of infancy, childhood, or adolescence NOS

Top

Delirium, dementia, and amnestic and other cognitive disorders

Delirium
 293.0 Delirium due to... [indicate the general medical condition]
 780.09 Delirium NOS

Dementia
 Dementia of the Alzheimer's Type, with early onset
 294.10 Without behavioral disturbance
 294.11 With behavioral disturbance
 Dementia of the Alzheimer's Type, with late onset
 294.10 Without behavioral disturbance
 294.11 With behavioral disturbance
 Vascular dementia
 290.40 Uncomplicated
 290.41 With delirium
 290.42 With delusions
 290.43 With depressed mood
 Dementia due to HIV disease
 294.10 Without behavioral disturbance
 294.11 With behavioral disturbance
 Dementia due to head trauma
 294.10 Without behavioral disturbance
 294.11 With behavioral disturbance
 Dementia due to Parkinson's disease
 294.10 Without behavioral disturbance
 294.11 With behavioral disturbance
 Dementia due to Huntington's disease
 294.10 Without behavioral disturbance
 294.11 With behavioral disturbance
 Dementia due to Pick's disease
 294.10 Without behavioral disturbance
 294.11 With behavioral disturbance
 Dementia due to Creutzfeldt–Jakob disease
 294.10 Without behavioral disturbance
 294.11 With behavioral disturbance
 Dementia due to... [indicate other general medical condition]
 294.10 Without behavioral disturbance
 294.11 With behavioral disturbance
 294.8 Dementia NOS

Amnestic disorders
 294.0 Amnestic disorder due to... [indicate the general medical condition]
 294.8 Amnestic disorder NOS

Other cognitive disorders
 294.9 Cognitive disorder NOS

Top

Mental disorders due to a general medical condition not elsewhere classified
 293.89 Catatonic disorder due to... [indicate the general medical condition]
 310.1 Personality change due to... [indicate the general medical condition]
 (Subtypes: Labile, Disinhibited, Aggressive, Apathetic, Paranoid, Other, Combined, Unspecified)
 293.9 Mental disorder NOS due to... [indicate the general medical condition]

Top

Substance-related disorders

Alcohol-related disorders
 Alcohol
 305.00 Abuse
 303.90 Dependence
 291.89 -Induced anxiety disorder
 291.89 -Induced mood disorder
 291.1 -Induced persisting amnestic disorder
 291.2 -Induced persisting dementia
 291.5 -Induced psychotic disorder, with delusions
 291.3 -Induced psychotic disorder, with hallucinations
 291.89 -Induced sexual dysfunction
 291.89 -Induced sleep disorder
 303.00 Intoxication
 291.0 Intoxication delirium
 291.9 -Related disorder NOS
 291.81 Withdrawal
 291.0 Withdrawal delirium

Amphetamine (or amphetamine-like) related disorders
 Amphetamine (or amphetamine-like)
 305.70 Abuse
 304.40 Dependence
 292.89 -Induced anxiety disorder
 292.84 -Induced mood disorder
 292.11 -Induced psychotic disorder, with delusions
 292.12 -Induced psychotic disorder, with hallucinations
 292.89 -Induced sexual dysfunction
 292.89 -Induced sleep disorder
 292.89 Intoxication
 292.81 Intoxication delirium
 292.9 -Related disorder NOS
 292.0 Withdrawal

Caffeine-related disorders
 Caffeine
 292.89 -Induced anxiety disorder
 292.89 -Induced sleep disorder
 305.90 Intoxication
 292.9 -Related disorder NOS
 293.9.10 consumption diversion

Cannabis-related disorders
 Cannabis
 305.20 Abuse
 304.30 Dependence
 292.89 -Induced anxiety disorder
 292.11 -Induced psychotic disorder, with delusions
 292.12 -Induced psychotic disorder, with hallucinations
 292.89 Intoxication
 292.81 Intoxication delirium
 292.9 -Related disorder NOS

Cocaine-related disorders
 Cocaine
 305.60 Abuse
 304.20 Dependence
 292.89 -Induced anxiety disorder
 292.84 -Induced mood disorder
 292.11 -Induced psychotic disorder, with delusions
 292.12 -Induced psychotic disorder, with hallucinations
 292.89 -Induced sexual dysfunction
 292.89 -Induced sleep disorder
 292.89 Intoxication
 292.81 Intoxication delirium
 292.9 -Related disorder NOS
 292.0 Withdrawal

Hallucinogen-related disorders
Hallucinogen
 305.30 Abuse
 304.50 Dependence
 292.89 -Induced anxiety disorder
 292.84 -Induced mood disorder
 292.11 -Induced psychotic disorder, with delusions
 292.12 -Induced psychotic disorder, with hallucinations
 292.89 Intoxication
 292.81 Intoxication delirium
 292.89 -persisting perception disorder
 292.9 -Related disorder NOS

Inhalant-related disorders
 Inhalant
 305.90 Abuse
 304.60 Dependence
 292.89 -Induced anxiety disorder
 292.84 -Induced mood disorder
 292.82 -Induced persisting dementia
 292.11 -Induced psychotic disorder, with delusions
 292.12 -Induced psychotic disorder, with hallucinations
 292.89 Intoxication
 292.81 Intoxication delirium
 292.9 -Related disorder NOS

Nicotine-related disorders
 Nicotine
 305.1 Dependence
 292.9 -Related disorder NOS
 292.0 Withdrawal

Opioid-related disorders
 Opioid
 305.50 Abuse
 304.00 Dependence
 292.84 -Induced mood disorder
 292.11 -Induced psychotic disorder, with delusions
 292.12 -Induced psychotic disorder, with hallucinations
 292.89 -Induced sexual dysfunction
 292.89 -Induced sleep disorder
 292.89 Intoxication
 292.81 Intoxication delirium
 292.9 -Related disorder NOS
 292.0 Withdrawal

Phencyclidine (or phencyclidine-like) related disorders
 Phencyclidine (or phencyclidine-like)
 305.90 Abuse
 304.60 Dependence
 292.89 -Induced anxiety disorder
 292.84 -Induced mood disorder
 292.11 -Induced psychotic disorder, with delusions
 292.12 -Induced psychotic disorder, with hallucinations
 292.89 Intoxication
 292.81 Intoxication delirium
 292.9 -Related disorder NOS

Sedative-, hypnotic-, or anxiolytic-related disorders
 Sedative, hypnotic, or anxiolytic
 305.40 Abuse
 304.10 Dependence
 292.89 -Induced anxiety disorder
 292.84 -Induced mood disorder
 292.83 -Induced persisting amnestic disorder
 292.82 -Induced persisting dementia
 292.11 -Induced psychotic disorder, with delusions
 292.12 -Induced psychotic disorder, with hallucinations
 292.89 -Induced sexual dysfunction
 292.89 -Induced sleep disorder
 292.89 Intoxication
 292.81 Intoxication delirium
 292.9 -Related disorder NOS
 292.0 Withdrawal
 292.81 Withdrawal delirium

Polysubstance-related disorder
 304.80 Polysubstance dependence

Other (or unknown) substance-related disorder
 Other (or unknown) substance
 305.90 Abuse
 304.90 Dependence
 292.89 -Induced anxiety disorder
 292.81 -Induced delirium
 292.84 -Induced mood disorder
 292.83 -Induced persisting amnestic disorder
 292.82 -Induced persisting dementia
 292.11 -Induced psychotic disorder, with delusions
 292.12 -Induced psychotic disorder, with hallucinations
 292.89 -Induced sexual dysfunction
 292.89 -Induced sleep disorder
 292.89 Intoxication
 292.9 -Related disorder NOS
 292.0 Withdrawal
 293.0 Delirium Due to ... [Indicate the General Medical Condition]
Top

Schizophrenia and other psychotic disorders
 Schizophrenia
 295.20 Catatonic type
 295.10 Disorganized type
 295.30 Paranoid type
 295.60 Residual type
 295.90 Undifferentiated type
 295.40 Schizophreniform disorder
 295.70 Schizoaffective disorder
 297.1 Delusional disorder
 Erotomanic subtype
 Grandiose subtype
 Jealous subtype
 Persecutory subtype
 Somatic subtype
 Mixed type
 298.8 Brief psychotic disorder
 297.3 Shared psychotic disorder
 Psychotic disorder due to... [indicate the general medical condition]
 293.81 With delusions
 293.82 With hallucinations
 298.9 Psychotic disorder NOS

Top

Mood disorders

 293.83 Mood Disorder Due to...[Indicate the General Medical Condition]
 296.90 Mood Disorder NOS

Depressive disorders
 300.4 Dysthymic disorder
 Major depressive disorder
 Major depressive disorder, recurrent
 296.36 In full remission
 296.35 In partial remission
 296.31 Mild
 296.32 Moderate
 296.33 Severe without psychotic features
 296.34 Severe with psychotic features
 296.30 Unspecified
 Major depressive disorder, single episode
 296.26 In full remission
 296.25 In partial remission
 296.21 Mild
 296.22 Moderate
 296.23 Severe without psychotic features
 296.24 Severe with psychotic features
 296.20 Unspecified
 311 Depressive disorder NOS

Bipolar disorders
 Bipolar disorders
 296.80 Bipolar disorder NOS
 Bipolar I disorder, most recent episode depressed
 296.56 In full remission
 296.55 In partial remission
 296.51 Mild
 296.52 Moderate
 296.53 Severe without psychotic features
 296.54 Severe with psychotic features
 296.50 Unspecified
 296.40 Bipolar I disorder, most recent episode hypomanic
 Bipolar I disorder, most recent episode manic
 296.46 In full remission
 296.45 In partial remission
 296.41 Mild
 296.42 Moderate
 296.43 Severe without psychotic features
 296.44 Severe with psychotic features
 296.40 Unspecified
 Bipolar I disorder, most recent episode mixed
 296.66 In full remission
 296.65 In partial remission
 296.61 Mild
 296.62 Moderate
 296.63 Severe without psychotic features
 296.64 Severe with psychotic features
 296.60 Unspecified
 296.7 Bipolar I disorder, most recent episode unspecified
 Bipolar I disorder, single manic episode
 296.06 In full remission
 296.05 In partial remission
 296.01 Mild
 296.02 Moderate
 296.03 Severe without psychotic features
 296.04 Severe with psychotic features
 296.00 Unspecified
 296.89 Bipolar II disorder
 301.13 Cyclothymic disorder
 293.83 Mood disorder due to... [indicate the general medical condition]
 296.90 Mood disorder NOS

Top

Anxiety disorders
 300.02 Generalized anxiety disorder
 Panic disorder
 300.21 With agoraphobia
 300.01 Without agoraphobia
 300.22 Agoraphobia without history of panic disorder
 300.29 Specific phobia
 300.23 Social phobia
 300.3 Obsessive-compulsive disorder
 309.81 Posttraumatic stress disorder
 308.3 Acute stress disorder
 293.84 Anxiety disorder due to a general medical condition
 293.89 Anxiety disorder due to... [indicate the general medical condition]
 300.00 Anxiety disorder NOS

Top

Somatoform disorders
 300.81 Somatization disorder
 300.82 Undifferentiated somatoform disorder
 300.11 Conversion disorder
 Pain disorder
 307.89 Associated with both psychological factors and a general medical condition
 307.80 Associated with psychological factors
 300.7 Hypochondriasis/Illness anxiety disorder
 300.7 Body dysmorphic disorder
 300.82 Somatoform disorder NOS
Top

Factitious disorders
 Factitious disorder
 300.19 With combined psychological and physical signs and symptoms
 300.19 With predominantly physical signs and symptoms
 300.16 With predominantly psychological signs and symptoms
 300.19 Factitious disorder NOS

Top

Dissociative disorders
300.6 Depersonalization disorder
300.12 Dissociative amnesia
300.14 Dissociative identity disorder
300.15 Dissociative disorder not otherwise specified

Sexual and gender identity disorders

Sexual dysfunctions
 625.8 Female hypoactive sexual desire disorder due to... [indicate the general medical condition]
 608.89 Male hypoactive sexual desire disorder due to... [indicate the general medical condition]
 302.71 Hypoactive sexual desire disorder
 302.79 Sexual aversion disorder
 302.72 Female sexual arousal disorder
 302.72 Male erectile disorder
 607.84 Male erectile disorder due to... [indicate the general medical condition]
 302.73 Female orgasmic disorder
 302.74 Male orgasmic disorder
 302.75 Premature ejaculation
 302.76 Dyspareunia (not due to a general medical condition)
 625.0 Female dyspareunia due to... [indicate the general medical condition]
 608.89 Male dyspareunia due to... [indicate the general medical condition]
 306.51 Vaginismus (not due to a general medical condition)
 625.8 Other female sexual dysfunction due to... [indicate the general medical condition]
 608.89 Other male sexual dysfunction due to... [indicate the general medical condition]
 302.70 Sexual dysfunction NOS

Paraphilias

302.4 Exhibitionism
302.81 Fetishism
302.89 Frotteurism
302.2 Pedophilia
302.83 Sexual masochism
302.84 Sexual sadism
302.3 Transvestic fetishism
302.82 Voyeurism
302.9 Paraphilia NOS (not otherwise specified)

Gender identity disorders
Gender identity disorder
 302.85 In adolescents or adults
 302.6 In children
 302.6 Gender identity disorder NOS
 302.9 Sexual disorder NOS

Eating disorders
 307.1 Anorexia nervosa
 307.51 Bulimia nervosa
 307.50 Eating disorder not otherwise specified (EDNOS)

Top

Sleep disorders

Primary sleep disorders
 307.44 Primary hypersomnia
 307.42 Primary insomnia
 347 Narcolepsy
 780.59 Breathing-related sleep disorder
 307.45 Circadian rhythm sleep disorder
 307.47 Dyssomnia NOS
 327.03 Insomnia Related to Mood Disorder (ICD 9)

Parasomnias
 307.47 Nightmare disorder
 307.46 Sleep terror disorder
 307.46 Sleepwalking disorder
 307.47 Parasomnia NOS

Other sleep disorders
 Sleep disorder
 Sleep disorder due to... [indicate the general medical condition]
 780.54 Hypersomnia type
 780.52 Insomnia type
 780.59 Mixed type
 780.59 Parasomnia type
 307.42 Insomnia related to... [indicate the Axis I or Axis II disorder]
 307.44 Hypersomnia related to... [indicate the Axis I or Axis II disorder]

Top

Impulse-Control Disorders Not Elsewhere Classified
 312.34 Intermittent Explosive Disorder
 312.32 Kleptomania
 312.31 Pathological Gambling
 312.33 Pyromania
 312.39 Trichotillomania
 312.30 Impulse-Control Disorder NOS

Top

Adjustment disorders
 Adjustment disorders
 309.9 Unspecified
 309.24 With anxiety
 309.0 With depressed mood
 309.3 With disturbance of conduct
 309.28 With mixed anxiety and depressed mood
 309.4 With mixed disturbance of emotions and conduct

Top

Personality disorders (Axis II)
Cluster A (odd or eccentric)
 301.0 Paranoid personality disorder
 301.20 Schizoid personality disorder
 301.22 Schizotypal personality disorder
Cluster B (dramatic, emotional, or erratic)
 301.7 Antisocial personality disorder
 301.83 Borderline personality disorder
 301.50 Histrionic personality disorder
 301.81 Narcissistic personality disorder
Cluster C (anxious or fearful)
 301.82 Avoidant personality disorder
 301.6 Dependent personality disorder
 301.4 Obsessive-compulsive personality disorder
NOS
 301.9 Personality disorder not otherwise specified

Top

Additional codes
 V62.3 Academic problem
 V62.4 Acculturation problem
 995.2 Adverse effects of medication NOS
 780.9 Age-related cognitive decline
 Antisocial behavior
 V71.01 Adult antisocial behavior
 V71.02 Child or adolescent antisocial behavior
 V62.82 Bereavement
 V62.89 Borderline intellectual functioning
 313.82 Identity problem
 Medication-induced
 Movement disorder
 333.90 Movement disorder NOS
 333.1 Postural tremor
 Neglect of child
 V61.21 Neglect of child
 995.5 Neglect of child (if focus of attention is on victim)
 Neuroleptic-induced
 333.99 Acute akathisia
 333.7 Acute dystonia
 332.1 Parkinsonism
 333.82 Tardive dyskinesia
 333.92 Neuroleptic malignant syndrome
 V71.09 No diagnosis on Axis II
 V71.09 No diagnosis or condition on Axis I
 V15.81 Noncompliance with treatment
 V62.2 Occupational problem
 V61.20 Parent-child relational problem
 V61.10 Partner relational problem
 V62.89 Phase of life problem
 Physical abuse
 V61.1 Physical abuse of adult
 995.81 Physical abuse of adult (if focus of attention is on victim)
 V61.21 Physical abuse of child
 995.5 Physical abuse of child (if focus of attention is on victim)
 316 Psychological factors affecting medical condition
 Relational problem
 V62.81 Relational problem NOS
 V61.9 Relational problem related to a mental disorder or general medical condition
 V62.89 Religious or spiritual problem
 V61.1 Sexual abuse of adult
 995.83 Sexual abuse of adult (if focus of attention is on victim)
 V61.21 Sexual abuse of child
 995.53 Sexual abuse of child (if focus of attention is on victim)
 V61.8 Sibling relational problem
 300.9 Unspecified mental disorder (nonpsychotic)
 799.9 Diagnosis deferred on Axis II
 799.9 Diagnosis or condition deferred on Axis I
 V65.2 Malingering

See also
Clinical coder
Diagnostic and Statistical Manual of Mental Disorders, Fourth Edition, 1994 (DSM-IV).
DSM-5
List of ICD-9 codes 290–319: mental disorders
Relational disorder (proposed DSM-V new diagnosis)
Structured Clinical Interview for DSM-IV (SCID)

External links
 The Diagnostic and Statistical Manual of Mental Disorders (DSM), published by the American Psychiatric Association (APA, via archive.org)

References

Diagnostic and Statistical Manual of Mental Disorders
Psychology lists